Daniel Rossi Silva (born 4 January 1981), commonly known as just Daniel Rossi, is a Brazilian football midfielder who last played for Jablonec in the Czech Synot liga.

Club statistics

Honours 
SK Sigma Olomouc
 Czech Supercup: 2012

References

External links
 
 
 
 Daniel Rossi at Football-Lineups
 Kawasaki Frontale profile

1981 births
Living people
People from Rio Claro, São Paulo
Brazilian footballers
Brazilian expatriate footballers
São Paulo FC players
Avaí FC players
Rio Claro Futebol Clube players
Czech First League players
SK Sigma Olomouc players
FK Jablonec players
Kawasaki Frontale players
J1 League players
Association football midfielders
Expatriate footballers in the Czech Republic
Expatriate footballers in Japan
Brazilian expatriate sportspeople in the Czech Republic
Brazilian expatriate sportspeople in Japan
Footballers from São Paulo (state)